Tangier Grand Lake is a lake in the Halifax Regional Municipality of Nova Scotia, Canada. It is located near Mooseland, Nova Scotia.

Description
The lake is located on the Eastern Shore Granite Ridge, an area of 350-million year old granite bedrock.

History
The remnants of a sluice, once used in log driving, can be found on Struggle Brook, one of the primary inflows into Tangier Grand Lake from Crooked Lake.

See also
List of lakes in Nova Scotia
Mooseland, Nova Scotia

References

Lakes of Nova Scotia